Baker Township is a township in Izard County, Arkansas, United States. Its total population was 203 as of the 2010 United States Census, an increase of 0.5 percent from 202 at the 2000 census.

According to the 2010 Census, Baker Township is located at  (36.225927, -91.828099).

Parts of the cities of Horseshoe Bend and Oxford are located within the township.

References

External links 

Townships in Arkansas
Populated places in Izard County, Arkansas